Sirala  is a  village located in the Telangana state India.

References 

Villages in Nirmal district